Major-General Anthony Bernard Crowfoot  (1936 – 13 September 2008) was an officer of the British Army.

Early life
Born in Norfolk, he was educated at King Edward VII Grammar School, King's Lynn. When Crowfoot was six, his father was killed near Cologne while piloting an Avro Lancaster during the Second World War.

Military career
Crowfoot was commissioned into the East Yorkshire Regiment in 1956. He became Commander 39th Infantry Brigade in Northern Ireland in 1980, Deputy Commander, Land Forces, Hong Kong in 1983 and Director-General, Army Manning and Recruiting in 1986. His last appointment was as General Officer Commanding North West District in 1989 before retiring in 1991.

He was appointed a Companion of the Order of the Bath in the 1991 Birthday Honours.

He was married to Bridget; they had three sons and one daughter. He died of cancer on 13 September 2008.

References

 

1936 births
2008 deaths
British Army major generals
Companions of the Order of the Bath
Commanders of the Order of the British Empire
People educated at King Edward VII Academy